Belzberg may refer to:

Places 
 Belzberg (hill), a hill in the Buocher Höhe in Germany

People 
 Edet Belzberg, documentary filmmaker
 Jenny Belzberg (born 1928),  Canadian philanthropist
 Leslie Belzberg (born 1953), American film- and TV producer
 Morris Belzberg (born 1929), Canadian-born businessman
 Samuel Belzberg (1928–2018), Canadian business man and philanthropist
 Hagy Belzberg (born 1964), American architect

Companies 
 Belzberg Architects, an architecture and interior design firm